= Hunting Hill =

- Location within Canada

Highest point
- Elevation: 778 m (2,552 ft)
- Prominence: 3 m (9.8 ft)
- Coordinates: 50.859°N 111.798°W

Naming
- Native name: Onachewassawapewin (Cree)

Geography
- Location: Alberta

Hunting Hill is a summit in Alberta, Canada. It is located 319 kilometres (198 mi) from Alberta's capital city, Edmonton. It has a peak elevation of 778 meters (2,552 ft) above sea level, with prominence of 3 meters (9.8 ft) compared to the surrounding area. The width at its base is 0.22 meters.

Hunting Hill's English name comes from the Cree Indians of the area, who used the hill as a lookout point in order to hunt buffalo.
